Dwayne Mars (born 9 February 1989) is a Barbadian international footballer who plays for Notre Dame SC, as a striker.

Career
Mars played college soccer at Quinnipiac University between 2007 and 2010, before signing for Notre Dame SC in 2011.

He made his international debut for Barbados in 2011, and has appeared in FIFA World Cup qualifying matches.

References

1989 births
Living people
Barbadian footballers
Barbados international footballers
Barbados under-20 international footballers
Barbados youth international footballers
Association football forwards
Quinnipiac Bobcats men's soccer players
Notre Dame SC players
Barbadian expatriate footballers
Barbadian expatriate sportspeople in the United States
Expatriate soccer players in the United States
People from Saint Michael, Barbados